The Highschool Football League (HFL), founded in 2006 by Chinese Taipei Football Association, is the second-level football (soccer) league in the Republic of China (Taiwan). The competitions are played between senior-high school teams (under-19 men). In 2008, HFL's main sponsor changed to Chinese Taipei School Sport Federation.

Format 
The league features a total of eight teams that compete during the first half of the year (e.g. February to May for the 2006 season). The top four teams of the National Youth Cup and the top two teams of current league season are granted to become league members next year. The remaining places are determined by qualification competitions held in December.

Teams

2007 teams

Other teams

Results

Wins by team 
 3 - Pei Men

League records 
 Most seasons: 3 – Pei Men, Taipei, and Yilan
 Most seasons won: 2 – Pei Men
 Most points: 27 – Pei Men (2007)
 Most goals for: 26 – Pei Men (2006) 
 Most goals against: 38 – Chung Cheng (2006)
 Most consecutive wins: 6 – San Chung (2006)
 Most consecutive losses: 6 – Taipei (2006)
 Most consecutive wins and draws: 7 – San Chung (2006)
 Largest wins: Hualien 9-1 Chung Cheng (2006)
 Top scorer: Chen Po-liang – 11 goals for Chung Cheng (2006)
 Top scorer in one game: Lin Ching-tsan – 4 goals for Hualien against Taipei, April 3, 2006

Sponsorship
Adidas

See also 
 Chinese Taipei Football Association
 List of football competitions in Taiwan

External links 
  HFL official site

 
2006 establishments in Taiwan
Football leagues in Taiwan
Youth football leagues